The Rajah is an album by jazz trumpeter Lee Morgan released on the Blue Note label. It was recorded on November 29, 1966 but not released until 1985, and features performances by Morgan, Hank Mobley, Cedar Walton, Paul Chambers and Billy Higgins. The recording was found in the Blue Note vaults by Michael Cuscuna in 1984.

Reception
The AllMusic review by Scott Yanow stated: "Despite its neglect, this is a fine session that Lee Morgan and hard bop fans will want."

Track listing 
 "A Pilgrim's Funny Farm" (Massey) – 13:34
 "The Rajah" (Morgan) – 9:10
 "Is That So?" (Pearson) – 5:18
 "Davisamba" (Davis) – 6:46
 "What Now, My Love?" (Bécaud) – 5:22
 "Once in a Lifetime" (Bricusse, Newley) – 5:50

Personnel 
 Lee Morgan – trumpet
 Hank Mobley – tenor saxophone
 Cedar Walton – piano
 Paul Chambers – bass
 Billy Higgins – drums

References 

Hard bop albums
Lee Morgan albums
1985 albums
Blue Note Records albums
Albums produced by Alfred Lion
Albums recorded at Van Gelder Studio